Wrong Turn may refer to:

Film
Wrong Turn (film series) — Seven different films, including:
 Wrong Turn (2003 film), a 2003 horror film by Rob Schmidt
Wrong Turn (2021 film), a 2021 slasher film by Mike P. Nelson

Music

Songs
"Wrong Turn" (Blanche song), a song by Blanche
"Wrong Turn", a song by Kim Petras from Turn Off the Light